Ah Toy Garden is a garden located within Payette National Forest. The garden was established by the Chinese American community in order to grow fruits and vegetables to maintain a traditional Chinese diet while Chinese immigrant laborers worked in the mines. There are three other Chinese-American gardens in the Warren Mining District.

The garden was listed in the National Register of Historic Places on June 27, 1990.

See also 
History of Chinese Americans in Idaho

References

Chinese-American history
Chinese gardens
Chinese-American culture in Idaho
Gardens in Idaho
Farms on the National Register of Historic Places in Idaho
Payette National Forest
Tourist attractions in Idaho County, Idaho
National Register of Historic Places in Idaho County, Idaho